Li Shenglong (Chinese: 李圣龙; born 30 July 1992 in  Shanghai) is a Chinese football player who currently plays for Chinese Super League side Shanghai SIPG.

Club career
Li started his professional football career in 2011 when he was loaned to Shanghai Zobon's squad for the 2011 China League Two campaign. He joined Chinese Super League's newcomer Shanghai Dongya in 2013. He made his Super League debut for Shanghai on 20 September 2013 in a game against Shandong Luneng, coming on as a substitute for Zhu Zhengrong in the 83rd minute. Li was demoted to the reserve squad in the 2016 season. On 8 August 2016, he received a ban of six months by Chinese Football Association for age falsification which he changed his age from 30 July 1992 to 27 January 1993. Li returned to first team in the 2017 season. On 9 July 2017, he scored his first goal for the club in a 4–2 away defeat against Changchun Yatai.

Personal life
Li Shenglong is the son of former Shanghai Shenhua midfielder Li Longhai.

Career statistics
Statistics accurate as of match played 31 December 2022.

Honours

Club
Shanghai SIPG
Chinese Super League: 2018
Chinese FA Super Cup: 2019

References

External links
 

1992 births
Living people
Chinese footballers
Footballers from Shanghai
Pudong Zobon players
Shanghai Port F.C. players
Association football forwards
China League Two players
Chinese Super League players
21st-century Chinese people